Hinduism is a very minor religious faith in Finland.

There are 5000 to 6000 Hindus in Finland. The majority are from India, Nepal and Sri Lanka. Finland acquired a significant Hindu population for the first time around the turn of the 21st century due to the recruitment of information technology workers from India by companies such as Nokia.

Demographics
The population of Hindus in Finland from 2000 to 2020, according to Statistics Finland:

However, according to another estimate in 2011, there were 524 Hindus in Finland. According to ARDA in 2015, there were 1080 Hindus in Finland. As of 2021, there are 10,749 Indians in Finland, as well as 5,012 Nepalis and 1,704 Sri Lankans (a total of 17,465), though it is not known how many of them are Hindus.

Controversy
In 2009, Hindu nationalists protested the inclusion of a photograph that "denigrates Hinduism" in an exhibit at the Kiasma Museum of Contemporary Art. The museum later removed the reference to Hinduism from the photograph.

Hindu Groups in Finland
Ananda Marga, including the Sunrise Kindergarten in Espoo.
Chinmoy Mission.
Brahma Kumaris, Helsinki.
Sathya Sai Organisation.

There is an International Society for Krishna Consciousness temple in Ruoholahti, Helsinki.

Yoga of many varieties is flourishing. The Evangelical Lutheran Church of Finland, which claims over 80 per cent of native Finns as members, reports that yoga is practiced by tens of thousands.

See also
Hinduism in Sweden

References

External links
Finland Hindus To Build a Temple 
Sivalingam, 63, of Helsinki, was the first Srilankan Hindu to arrive in Finland
Amma organization in Finland
Finland: Few individuals go North by Urmila Goel
ISKCON Finland Finnish Language Website
 Blissful Scenes from Sri Krsna Janmastami and Srila Prabhupada Avirbhava Mahotsava in Helsinki, Finland
Finland´s First Ratha Yatra Festival In Helsinki May 27th 2006

Finland
Fin
Religion in Finland